Mayonnaise is a sauce.

Mayonnaise may also refer to:
 Mayonnaise (band), a Filipino alternative rock/pop-punk band
 Mayonnaise (Mayonnaise album), released in 2004
 Mayonnaise (Hypnotic Clambake album), 2005
 "Mayonaise" (song), a song on The Smashing Pumpkins album Siamese Dream
 "Mayonnaise" (Space Ghost Coast to Coast), a television episode
 DJ Mayonnaise, American alternative hip hop producer and DJ
 May O'Naize, a character in the Alien Nation: Dark Horizon

See also
 "Mayonesa" (Chocolate song), 2001